Peru is a country on the central western coast of South America facing the Pacific Ocean. Peru shares land borders with Ecuador, Colombia, Brazil, Bolivia, and Chile, with its longest land border shared with Brazil.

Statistics 

Area:
Peru has a total land area of 1,379,999 km2 and a total water area of 5,000 km2.

Maritime claims:
Continental shelf:
 
Territorial sea:

 Exclusive economic zone:

Land use:
Only 3% of Peru's land is arable, with 0.5% being suitable for permanent crops. Permanent pastureland accounts for 21% of Peru's land use, and forests and woodland accounting for 66% of the landscape. Approximately 9.5% (1993 est.) of Peruvian land is attributed to population centers, coastal regions, and other space.

Irrigated land:
12,800 km2 (1993 est.)

Natural hazards: Natural hazards that Peru experiences include earthquakes, tsunamis, flooding, landslides, and mild volcanic activity. The geographic positioning of Peru adjacent to the adjoining Nazca and South American tectonic plates - converging in the Atacama trench off the Pacific coast - serves as the catalyst to many of Peru's natural hazards.

Environment - current issues:
deforestation (some the result of illegal logging); overgrazing of the slopes of the coast and sierra leading to soil erosion; desertification; air pollution in Lima; pollution of rivers and coastal waters from municipal and mining wastes

Environment - international agreements:
party to:
Antarctic Treaty, Antarctic-Environmental Protocol, Biodiversity, Climate Change, Desertification, Endangered Species, Hazardous Wastes, Nuclear Test Ban, Ozone Layer Protection, Ship Pollution, Tropical Timber 83, Tropical Timber 94, Wetlands, Whaling	
signed, but not ratified:
Climate Change-Kyoto Protocol

Peru shares control of Lake Titicaca, world's highest navigable lake, with Bolivia.

Urbanization 
The most populated city in the country is Lima, the capital of Peru. Lima's metropolitan area has a population over 10 million. The second largest city in Peru, Callao, has a population of 1 300,000, and third city Arequipa Peru's developed urban cities are found in coastal regions and to the north. There are 32.1 million people who live in Peru. The percentage of urbanization in Peru is 79.2%, and holds a yearly increase of 1.57%. Lima forms part of the largest cities in the Americas, and holds 31.7% of the country's population. The dense concentration of the population size of Peru is 25 people/km2 or 57/mi2. Lima is a pull factor that draws millions of Peruvians from the suburbs to the capital. This urban inland migration is the result of sprawling around Lima. These sprawling places are known as “Pueblos Jóvenes”. The young towns and Lima make up the metropolitan area that extend .

The urban growth brings issues to the metropolitan area and the environment. Lima is the most polluted city in Latin America. The overcrowding and growth of urbanization has caused Peruvians to use its green spaces for garbage disposal. This leads to the pollution of the river Rimac that supplies water to the metropolitan area.

The rise of urbanization forgets the historic sites, ruins or “huacas”, which are being replaced for buildings, roads, etc. Lima is home of 400 sites of 46,000 in the country, the country itself only preserves 1%.

Thousands of Venezuelans exactly 1,300,000 head to Peru in search of residency. The International migration is caused by social, environmental, and economic crises. This push factor migration has brought to Peru sustenance problems like instability and food shortage.

Climate 

The combination of tropical latitude, mountain ranges, topography variations and two ocean currents (Humboldt and El Niño) gives Peru a large diversity of climates. Peru has a tropical climate with a wet and dry season.

Amazon Basin or Low Amazon 
The eastern portions of Peru include the Amazon Basin or selva baja, a region that is larger in the north than in the south. Representing roughly 60% of Peru's national territory, this area includes the Amazon, Marañón, Huallaga and Ucayali Rivers.

Almost 60% of the country's area is located within this region, giving Peru the fourth largest area of tropical forest in the world after Brazil, Congo and Indonesia.

Andean mountain ranges 
The Andes shelter the very largest variety of climates in the country. The climate is semi-arid in the valleys and moist in higher elevations and towards the eastern flanks. The monsoonal period starts in October and ends in April. The rainiest months are January through March where travel can be sometimes affected.

The western slopes are arid to semi-arid and receive rainfall only between January and March.

The northernmost regions of the Andes around Cajamarca and Piura regions have Páramo climates.

Coast 
The Peruvian coast is a microclimatic region. The region is affected by the cold Humboldt Current, the El Niño Southern Oscillation, tropical latitude, and the Andes mountain range.

The central and southern coast consists mainly of a subtropical desert climate composed of sandy or rocky shores and inland cutting valleys. Days alternate between overcast skies with occasional fog in the winter and sunny skies with occasional haze in the summer, with the only precipitation being an occasional light-to-moderate drizzle that is known locally as garúa. These regions are usually characterized by mildly cold lows and also mild highs. An exception is the southern coast, where it does get a bit warmer and drier for most of the year during daytime, and where it can also get much colder during winter nights.

The northern coast, on the contrary, has a curious tropical-dry climate, generally referred to as tropical savanna. This region is a lot warmer and can be unbearable during summer months, where rainfall is also present. The region differs from the southern coast by the presence of shrubs, equatorial dry forests (Tumbes–Piura dry forests ecoregion), mangrove forests, tropical valleys near rivers such as the Chira and the Tumbes.

Central and southern coast 
The central and southern coast have a subtropical desert climate, despite this region being located in the tropics. Additionally, due to the height of the Andes cordillera, there is no passage of hot clouds from the Amazon to the coast, the climate is cooler than that of similar tropical latitudes. This can create a great deal of humidity and fog during winter months.

Moreover, the Andes mountains are very close to the coast, a geographic factor that prevents cumulus or cumulonimbus clouds from appearing. Therefore, a shade effect is created, causing very low annual rainfall in this region.

The central coast is composed of regions including La Libertad, Ancash and Lima, which have a spring-like climate for most of the year. Foggy and sunny days intermingle around the humid sand dunes during most of the year.

Most summers (February–April) have pleasant temperatures ranging from  during the night to about  during the daytime. Winters (August–October) are very humid, and range from  during the nights to around the  during the day. The spring (November–January) and autumn (May–July) months have a pleasant climate that ranges from  during the day to around  during the night. Moving inland into the Yunga valleys, the climate tends to be ~ drier and warmer during any given month.

The southern coast, composed of the Ica, Arequipa, Moquegua and Tacna regions, has a drier and warmer climate during the day for all seasons, although colder in winter. There are regions famous for their sand dunes and impressive deserts that are, in part, caused by the drier and hotter climate. This purports the idea that the southern coast has a more desert-like climate, although daily temperature variations exist as they do in other regions within tropical latitudes. Clear skies are often present in desert areas and, although less common, near the coastal cliffs as well, which are home to a variety of fish and marine mammals.

Northern coast 
The northern coast consists of the eastern region of Lambayeque, the Piura Region and the Tumbes Region.
They are characterized by having different climate and geography from the rest of the coast. Right between the 3-hour drive on the Sechura desert, which is located north of the Lambayeque Region and south of the Piura Region, is the evidence of climate change from the common subtropical desert found on the south to visible tropicalization effects of the tropical dry climate or tropical savanna. Examples of this are the tropical dry forests that begin to appear. They are composed of shrubs, thorny trees, carob trees, faique trees, guayacan trees, hualtaco trees, palo santo trees, ceibo trees and on the coast
mangrove forests. It is also a biodiverse area where typical wildlife can be observed such as crocodiles, reptiles, iguanas, boas, pava aliblanca, anteater, bear, sloth (bearh) and many more.

This climatic change is caused by the presence of the warm El Niño Current during the summer months (December to April), the eventual El Niño Phenomenon and the passing of Amazon Jungles clouds due to mountain openings and lower altitudes of the Andes Chain. It is directly off the shores of the Sechura Region where the cold Humboldt current and warm El Niño current meet, at about 5° to 6° south of the equator. From this point, warm temperatures are most common, and there are no true winters.

Winters (June–September) are cooler during the nights; around  during the night, to around  during the daytime.

There are protected areas in Tumbes and Piura filled with tropical canelo forests and tropical dry forests such as Caza de Coto and Cerros de Amotape, both extending into southern Ecuador. The areas of eastern Lambayeque also have  tropical dry forests, which are found in the Chaparri and Chongoyape provinces. These forests have the particularity of connecting to the Amazon basin through the Marañon passage (an area where there are also tropical dry forests). Mangrove forests are located in four specific areas from Sechura to Tumbes.

In these regions, the mangrove forests are at the ending strips of the Piura River in the Sechura Province (the southernmost mangroves in the Pacific Ocean). To the north, the ending strips of the Chira River, Tumbes River, and Zarumilla River also have mangrove forests that flow into the ocean.

Terrain:
western coastal plain (costa), high and rugged Andes in center (sierra), eastern lowland jungle of Amazon Basin (selva).

Natural resources:
copper, silver, gold, petroleum, timber, fish, iron ore, coal, phosphate, potash, hydropower.

Extreme points 
This is a list of the extreme points of Peru, the points that are farther north, south, east or west than any other location.

 Northernmost point: Putumayo River in the Putumayo District, Maynas Province, Loreto Region
 Southernmost point: Pacific shore  in the Tacna District, Tacna Province, Tacna Region
 Westernmost point: either Punta Pariñas in the La Brea District, Talara Province, Piura Region or Pacific shore ( south of Punta Pariñas) in the La Brea District, Talara Province, Piura Region
 Easternmost point: Mouth of the Heath River in the Tambopata District, Tambopata Province, Madre de Dios Region

Agriculture
Peru's agricultural lands make up 18.5% of Peru's total surface area, a substantially lower percentage compared to its neighbors who average at around 22% agricultural land. Common crops include, but are not limited to root vegetables like potatoes and cassava; peppers including chilies and paprika; vegetables like asparagus, tomatoes; quinoa; kiwicha; and fruits like mangoes, passion fruit, citrus, and bananas. Levels of undernourished citizens and children who suffer from undernourishment has dramatically decreased from just under six million to just over two million between 2000 and 2017, while food availability has increased from an energy percentage of 105 to 117 between 2000 and 2017.

Environmental Degradation
As food production in Peru increases, farmers saturate the soil with nutrients with Nitrogen and Phosphorus bases. Oversaturation of nutrients leads to eutrophication in nearby water bodies resulting in dead zones. Carbon emissions due to manufacturing and food processing leads to reduced air quality which contributes to the global warming that increases severity of natural disasters and acidifies the ocean leading to mass bleaching in coral reefs which will destroy oceanic ecosystems.

References

External links 
Ancient Inca History from Information about Ancient Inca History
Instituto Geografico Nacional National Institute of Geography, Peru